Rodrigo Hitoshi "Bo" Kaimoti Takahashi (born January 23, 1997) is a Brazilian professional baseball pitcher for the Saitama Seibu Lions of Nippon Professional Baseball (NPB). He previously played for the Kia Tigers of the KBO League.

Career

Arizona Diamondbacks
Takahashi signed with the Arizona Diamondbacks as an international free agent in December 2013.

He made his professional debut with the AZL Diamondbacks in 2014, going 3–4 with a 4.39 ERA in 41 innings. He played for the Missoula Osprey in 2015, going 8–1 with a 4.66 ERA in  innings. He split the 2016 season between the Hillsboro Hops, Kane County Cougars, and Visalia Rawhide, combining to go 6–4 with a 2.81 ERA over  innings. He split the 2017 season between Kane County and Visalia, combining to go 7–12 with a 5.14 ERA over 126 innings. He was a 2017 California League mid-season All Star. His 2018 season was split between Visalia and the Jackson Generals, combining to go 6–6 with a 4.03 ERA in  innings. He played for the Salt River Rafters of the Arizona Fall League following the 2018 season.

The Diamondbacks added him to their 40-man roster after the 2018 season. He opened the 2019 season back with Jackson. On August 18, 2019, the Diamondbacks promoted Takahashi to the major leagues. He was optioned to Jackson on August 20 without appearing in an MLB game in 2019. He finished the 2019 season going 9–7 with a 3.72 ERA and 104 strikeouts over  innings for Jackson.

On October 27, 2020, Takahashi was outrighted off of the 40-man roster, without having made a major league appearance. He became a free agent on November 2, 2020.

Cincinnati Reds
On December 18, 2020, Takahashi signed a minor league contract with the Cincinnati Reds organization. Takahashi appeared in 18 games for the Triple-A Louisville Bats, recording a 4.45 ERA with 89 strikeouts. On August 25, 2021, Takahashi was released by the Reds.

Kia Tigers
On August 28, 2021, Takahashi signed with the Kia Tigers of the KBO League. Takahashi posted a 4.18 ERA in 6 starts for the Tigers.

Saitama Seibu Lions
On December 16, 2021, Takahashi signed with the Saitama Seibu Lions of Nippon Professional Baseball for the 2022 season.

International career
In 2016, he played for the Brazil national baseball team in the 2017 World Baseball Classic qualification and will compete once again for Brazil at the 2021 World Baseball Classic qualification in Tucson, Arizona.

Personal life
Takahashi is a Brazilian of Japanese descent. He is fluent in the English, Portuguese, and Spanish languages, and can also understand Japanese.

References

External links	

1997 births
Living people
People from Presidente Prudente, São Paulo
Brazilian expatriate baseball players in the United States
Brazilian people of Japanese descent
Baseball pitchers
Arizona League Diamondbacks players
Missoula Osprey players
Hillsboro Hops players
Kane County Cougars players
Visalia Rawhide players
Jackson Generals (Southern League) players
Salt River Rafters players
Louisville Bats players
Nippon Professional Baseball pitchers
Saitama Seibu Lions players
Sportspeople from São Paulo (state)